Clement Stephenson (6 February 1890 – 24 October 1961) was an English footballer whose 20-year career at Aston Villa and Huddersfield Town included success in both the FA Cup and League Championship. Stephenson's place in history as an inside forward was assured when Herbert Chapman targeted him as the man to lead Huddersfield Town's challenge for three consecutive Football League titles in the 1920s, he also made a single appearance for England in that period.

Playing career

Aston Villa
Born in Blyth Northumberland, Stephenson originally played for Aston Villa in 1910 as an inside forward; his career at Villa Park totalling 216 matches, from which he scored a reasonable 85 goals. He was brought into Villa Park as Villa legend Harry Hampton's career was nearing its end and soon acquired a reputation for intuitive play: his passes were said to be "as sweet as stolen kisses". His first silverware came in the 1913 FA Cup Final alongside Hampton and England national team player Joe Bache in the victory over League Champions Sunderland; the only occasion in English football history when the FA Cup Final was contested between the top two clubs in The Football League. Stephenson claimed before the 1913 FA Cup final to have dreamt, that Villa, would beat Sunderland with a headed goal from Tommy Barber. Villa did indeed win that final with a headed goal from Tommy Barber. Stephenson was to play in the semi-final the following year and was a winner in the FA Cup final in 1920 in what proved a fitting swansong for the club.

During World War I Stephenson had guested for Leeds City, a club managed by Herbert Chapman, who, typically, saw qualities, beyond Stephenson's well-renowned lack of pace, that would serve the player in his later career. It was as a result of making irregular payments to such Wartime guest players as Stephenson (Chapman had secured the services of Charlie Buchan of Sunderland, Franny Walden of Tottenham Hotspur, and Billy Hampson of Newcastle United ) that Chapman's career at Leeds City came to a questionable end and led to the dissolution of the club in 1919.

Huddersfield Town
However, when Chapman took over the reins at Huddersfield Town (in August 1920) one of his first tasks was to secure Stephenson in a £4,000 move from Villa Park. This caused controversy at a time and at a club where money was scarce but within two seasons, Stephenson was playing inside-left in the narrow FA Cup victory over Preston North End at Stamford Bridge becoming the first player in the 20th century to win three winners' medals in the FA Cup and eventually took the captain's armband from Tommy Wilson. The Final was notable for the controversy surrounding the penalty decision that decided that match when Hamilton brought down Huddersfield's W.H. Smith. Ivan Sharpe, writing in the Sunday Chronicle, stated: "It was certainly a close thing. I had a fairly good view of the incident and my impression was 'Penalty!' The kick was to be taken by the victim, Smith. The goalkeeper Mitchell decided on the manoeuvre of dervish leaps in the air while the act was brewing, the intention obviously to put the Huddersfield marksman off his shot. 'Ne'er mind the devil-dances' seemed to be the tenor of Town captain Clem Stephenson as he advised Smith: 'Just shove it in the net.'

In another two seasons Huddersfield had won the first of three consecutive League Championships and Chapman was moved to write to Stephenson: "I want to thank you personally for your play, your wholehearted efforts both on and off the field. I have never had such confidence in any captain of a team I have been associated with." It was later written: "Chapman bought perceptively, welded his assets together astutely and soon sent out one of the most successful League sides of all time. It was stubborn, disciplined and highly mobile with Clem Stephenson, once of Aston Villa, at the heart of everything. He was a stocky tactician without much pace but his passes were as sweet as stolen kisses."  

Chapman brought in the free scoring George Brown and Alex Jackson and between 1924 and 1925 led the side to two consecutive League titles before departing for fame and fortune with Arsenal Without his guile the brio was gone and whereas Stephenson led Cecil Potter's team to a third straight League title in 1926 Huddersfield have never since won either the League Championship or the FA Cup instead finishing in second place in the League in 1927 and 1928 became the first side to have "Double Horror" and losing the 1928 FA Cup Final to Blackburn Rovers and finishing second to Everton by 2 points. They lost the semi-final to Bolton Wanderers the following year and Stephenson played his last game for the club that year, becoming manager in May 1929 taking over from Jack Chaplin.

Career statistics

Management career
Stephenson went on to become Huddersfield's longest-serving manager from 27 May 1929 until 8 June 1942 overseeing club records:
The record 10–1 victory over Blackpool in December 1930 at Leeds Road.
The record attendance at Leeds Road 67,037 attended in the FA Cup quarter-final versus a Herbert Chapman led Arsenal.

But his League and Cup exploits were fraught with irony leading Huddersfield to second place in 1933–34 losing to Arsenal by 3 points in the season Herbert Chapman died, and reaching two FA Cup Finals and losing both: the first to a Herbert Chapman led Arsenal and the other to Preston North End in an exact reversal of the 1922 final, and the semi-final to Portsmouth the following year. Huddersfield have never reached the FA Cup semi-final since 1939.

Honours
Aston Villa
First Division runners-up: 1910–11, 1912–13, 1913–14
FA Cup  winners: 1913, 1920

Huddersfield Town (Player & manager)
First Division champions: 1923–24, 1924–25, 1925–26
Runners-up: 1926–27, 1927–28, 1933–34
FA Cup winners: 1922
Runners-up: 1928, 1930, 1938
FA Charity Shield winners: 1922

References

External links
Aston Villa career summary at Aston Villa Player Database
Hall of Fame
Added to Hall of Fame

1890 births
1961 deaths
English footballers
Association football midfielders
English Football League players
Aston Villa F.C. players
Leeds City F.C. wartime guest players
Huddersfield Town A.F.C. players
England international footballers
English football managers
Huddersfield Town A.F.C. managers
English Football Hall of Fame inductees
English Football League representative players
West Stanley F.C. players
Blyth Spartans A.F.C. players
Durham City A.F.C. players
Royal Naval Volunteer Reserve personnel of World War I
FA Cup Final players